Shafiqur Rahman Barq (born 11 July 1930) is an Indian politician belonging to the Samajwadi Party. He has been elected to Lok Sabha at various times from Moradabad as Samajwadi Party candidate  and Sambhal, most recently in 2019.

Career

He has been three times Member of Parliament as Samajwadi Party candidate and in 2008 he joined  Bahujan Samaj Party and won the 2009 Loksabha election from Sambhal. He again joined Samajwadi Party in Feb 2014 and contested 2014 Loksabha election from Sambhal constituency and lost the election.

He came into news after taking the oath as a member of Lok Sabha when he declared that Vande Mataram is against Islam and Muslims cannot follow it.

He received widespread criticism for defending the Taliban takeover of Afghanistan and equating it with India's own freedom struggle.

Positions held 
Shafiqur Rahman Barq has been elected 4 times as MLA and 5 times as Lok Sabha MP.

References 

India MPs 1996–1997
India MPs 1998–1999
India MPs 2004–2009
India MPs 2009–2014
India MPs 2019–present
Samajwadi Party politicians
Bahujan Samaj Party politicians from Uttar Pradesh
Lok Sabha members from Uttar Pradesh
People from Sambhal district
Living people
Uttar Pradesh MLAs 1989–1991
All India Majlis-e-Ittehadul Muslimeen politicians
Uttar Pradesh MLAs 1974–1977
Uttar Pradesh MLAs 1977–1980
Uttar Pradesh MLAs 1985–1989
People from Moradabad district
1930 births